The Great North West Half Marathon is an annual road running event staged in Blackpool, United Kingdom. 
It is held in February and organised by the Fylde Coast Runners running club.
The course is flat and popular as a training race for the London Marathon.

Past winners 

Since 2004 the only athletes to have won their event twice have been Mike Proudlove and Carly Needham.

References

External links

Half marathons in the United Kingdom
February events
Annual sporting events in the United Kingdom